The Christian-Democratic Union (in Dutch: Christelijk-Democratische Unie) was a minor progressive Protestant party in the Netherlands during the interbellum.

History
The CDU was formed in 1926 as a merger of three even smaller Christian left-wing parties, the Christian Social Party, the Christian Democratic Party and the League of Christian Socialists. It had one seat between 1929 and 1937 and two between 1937 and 1946. The party always was in opposition.

It was linked to the minor denomination Reformed Churches in Repaired Union (Dutch:  Gereformeerde Kerken in Hersteld Verband), which split from the mainstream Reformed churches, because of its pacifism. The Synod of the reformed church therefore decreed disciplinary measures against members of the CDU.

After World War II, the party joined the newly founded Partij van de Arbeid. In the 1950s many members left to join the pacifist PSP because of the relatively right-wing course of the PvdA.

Ideology
The CDU stood for a just society based on biblical rules. The party's principles were based on the work of reformed theologian Karl Barth. It was a left-wing party to the extent that it was opposed to war in any form and demanded radical redistribution of income, nationalisation of core industries and influence of workers on corporations. It was in favor of Christian Democracy to the extent that it wanted to keep the sabbath.

Electoral results

House of Representatives

References

External links
Small political parties in Dutch

Defunct political parties in the Netherlands
Christian pacifism
Confessional parties in the Netherlands
Labour Party (Netherlands)
Pacifism in the Netherlands
Pacifist parties
Protestant political parties
Political parties established in 1926
Political parties disestablished in 1946
Defunct Christian political parties
1926 establishments in the Netherlands